Quintalia is a genus of air-breathing land snails or semislugs, terrestrial pulmonate gastropod mollusks in the family Helicarionidae.

Species 
Species within the genus Quintalia include:
 Quintalia flosculus
 Quintalia stoddartii

References

 Taxonomicon info on the genus

 
Helicarionidae
Taxonomy articles created by Polbot